Eucalyptus pimpiniana, commonly known as the pimpin mallee, is a species of shrubby mallee that is endemic to the Great Victoria Desert of South Australia and Western Australia. It has smooth, mottled bark, lance-shaped adult leaves, flower buds in group of between seven and nineteen, yellow flowers and cylindrical to barrel-shaped fruit.

Description
It has smooth, mottled salmon-coloured, grey and brownish bark. Flowering is spasmodic but has been observed in January, July and October and the flowers are yellow.

Taxonomy and naming
Eucalyptus pimpiniana was first formally described in 1912 by Joseph Maiden in his book A Critical Revision of the Genus Eucalyptus from material collected by Henry Deane near Ooldea in 1909. Maiden recorded that "[t]he proposed specific name is from the native name of the plant".

Distribution and habitat
Pimpin mallee grows in red sand on sand dunes and sand plains in the southern half of the Great Victoria Desert from near Barton in South Australia to near Lake Minigwal in Western Australia.

Conservation status
This eucalypt is classified as "Priority Three" in Western Australia, by the Western Australian Government Department of Parks and Wildlife, meaning that it is poorly known and known from only a few locations but is not under imminent threat.

See also
List of Eucalyptus species

References

Eucalypts of Western Australia
pimpiniana
Myrtales of Australia
Plants described in 1912
Taxa named by Joseph Maiden